, also known by the nickname "Isotchi" (イソッチ), is a Japanese voice actress from Kanagawa Prefecture, Japan. Her prominent roles include Shōko Kirishima in Baka and Test, Aria Rozenburg in Hiiro no Kakera and Makoto Nanaya in the BlazBlue series. She was associated with Deux Plus and is now associated with Max Mix as of March 2010.

Filmography

Anime

Video games

References

External links
  
 

Living people
Japanese video game actresses
Japanese voice actresses
Voice actresses from Kanagawa Prefecture
Year of birth missing (living people)
21st-century Japanese actresses